The Spice SE89P is an IMSA GTP sports prototype race car, designed, developed and built by British manufacturer Spice Engineering, for sports car racing in the IMSA GT Championship, in 1989.

References

Sports prototypes
IMSA GTP cars